Henley is an English surname. Notable people with the surname include:

Adam Henley (born 1994), Welsh professional football (soccer) player
Althea Henley (1911–1996), American actress
Sir Andrew Henley, 1st Baronet (1622–75), English politician
Anthony Henley (1667–1711), English Whig politician and MP
Anthony Henley (cricketer)
Anthony Henley (died 1748) (1704–1748), British politician and MP
Anthony Henley, 3rd Baron Henley
Artie Henley (1878–1941), Australian rules footballer
Ashley Henley (1981–2021), American politician
Barclay Henley (1843–1914), U.S. Representative
Barry Shabaka Henley (born 1954), American character actor
Ben C. Henley (1907–1987), Arkansas Republican politician
Beth Henley (born 1952), Pulitzer Prize-winning playwright
Bob Henley (born 1973), American baseball player
Cack Henley (1884–1929), American baseball player
Carey Henley, marine, professional football player, and coach
Charley Henley, visual effects artist
Daiyan Henley (born 1999), American football player
Darryl Henley (born 1966), former NFL football player
Darryl Henley (born 1966), former American football cornerback in the National Football League
David Henley (1749–1823), Continental Army officer during the American Revolutionary War
David Henley (producer) (1894-1986), British film producer
Desmond Henley, British embalmer
D. L. George Henley (1917–1996), Canadian politician
Don Henley (born 1947), American rock musician, member of The Eagles
Drewe Henley (1940–2016), British actor
Elmer Wayne Henley (born 1956), American serial killer
Ernest Henley (athlete)
Ernest M. Henley (1924–2017), American atomic and nuclear physicist
Frances Henley (1896–1955), American architect
Francis Henley (1884–1963), English first-class cricketer active 1903–08
Fred L. Henley (1911–1994), Missouri Supreme Court judge
Gail Henley (born 1928), retired American pro baseball player
Garney Henley (born 1935), Canadian Football League player
George Henley (1890–1965), Justice of the Indiana Supreme Court for two months (March 15 to May 23, 1955)
Georgie Henley (born 1995), English actress
Henry Henley (1612–1696), British politician
Henry Holt Henley (died 1748), British lawyer and politician
Herbert Henley (1889–1966), Australian politician
Hobart Henley (1887–1964), American film actor/director
J. W. Henley (1793–1884), British politician
Jack Henley (1896–1958), American screenwriter
Jacques Henley (active 1930–1947), French actor
Jean Emily Henley (1910−1994), American anesthesiologist
Jeffrey O. Henley, Chairman of Oracle Corporation
Jesse Smith Henley (1917–1997), federal judge in Arkansas
Joan Henley (1904–1986), Irish actress and radio presenter
John Henley (1692–1759), English clergyman, known as Orator Henley
John D. Henley (1781–1835), US naval officer
John T. Henley (1921–2012), North Carolina politician
Joseph Warner Henley (1793–1884), British conservative politician in the protectionist governments of Lord Derby
Judith Henley (active 1975–2011 at the least), Australian opera singer
June Henley (born 1975), former NFL American football player
Larry Henley (1937–2014), American singer/songwriter
Les Henley (1922–1996), British football (soccer) player/manager
Margaret Henley (1888–1894), only child of a British poet; served as inspiration for several literary characters
Melvin Henley (born 1935), American politician
Micajah C. Henley (1856–1927), U.S. industrialist and inventor, "Roller Skate King"
Michael Henley (1939–2014), British bishop
Patrick Henley (born 1959), aka Henriette Valium, comic book artist and painter in Quebec
Paul Henley (British journalist)
Peter Henley (presenter)
Robert Henley (Birmingham mayor), 1st Mayor of Birmingham, Alabama (1871 to 1872)
Robert Henley (cricketer)
Robert Henley (naval officer) (1783–1828), US naval officer, brother of John D. Henley
Robert Henley, 1st Earl of Northington (c. 1708 – 1772), Lord Chancellor, Whig member of parliament, writer and wit
Robert Henley, 2nd Baron Henley (1789–1841), British lawyer and politician
Robert Henley, 2nd Earl of Northington
Ron Henley (born 1956), American chess grandmaster
Ron Henley (rapper), Filipino rapper and songwriter
Rosina Henley (1890–1978), American actress and screenwriter
Russell Henley (born 1989), American pro golfer on PGA Tour
Samuel Henley (1740–1815), British clergyman and teacher
Samuel Henley (ice hockey) (born 1993), Canadian former professional ice hockey forward
Sarah Ann Henley (1862–1948), British barmaid famous for surviving a 75-meter / 245 foot jump
Simon Henley FRAeS (born 1957), former Royal Navy officer, President of the Royal Aeronautical Society
Stephen R. Henley (active at least 2008–2009), U.S. Army colonel & lawyer
Stormi Henley (born 1990), Miss Teen USA 2009
Terry Henley, American football player
Tess Henley, American singer-songwriter and pianist from Kent, Washington, United States
Thomas Henley (Australian politician)
Thomas Henley (pirate) (1683–1685), pirate and privateer active in the Red Sea and the Caribbean
Thomas J. Henley (1808–1875), U.S. Representative from Indiana
Vic Henley (1962–2020), American comedian
Virginia Henley (born 1935) British romance-novel writer
Walter of Henley, agricultural writer of the thirteenth century
Weldon Henley (1880–1960), U.S. major league baseball pitcher
William Henley (disambiguation), multiple people

See also
Henley (disambiguation)
Hanley (disambiguation)
Hendley
Henle (disambiguation)
Henleys
Hennelly
Hensley (disambiguation)
Honley
Hunley

English-language surnames
English toponymic surnames